Gnorismoneura serrata is a moth of the family Tortricidae. It is found in China.

The wingspan is 14-16.5 mm for males and 18–19.5 mm for females. The ground color of the forewings is yellowish brown, scattered with some short strigulae (fine streaks) and black patterns. The hindwings are dark grey.

Etymology
The specific name is derived from the Latin word serratus (meaning serrate or having tooth-like projections) and refers to the dorsally serrate aedeagus.

References

Moths described in 2004
Archipini
Moths of Asia